Syntrophomonas wolfei is a bacterium. It is anaerobic, syntrophic and fatty acid-oxidizing. It has a multilayered cell wall of the gram-negative type.

References

Further reading

External links
 
 Type strain of Syntrophomonas wolfei at BacDive -  the Bacterial Diversity Metadatabase

Eubacteriales
Gram-positive bacteria
Bacteria described in 1981